The Joan Peninsula is a peninsula in Northeastern Ontario, Canada, situated in the central portion of Lake Temagami. It is surrounded by three portions of Lake Temagami; Granny Bay to the north, the Northwest Arm to the west and another arm of Lake Temagami to the east that connects with Granny Bay. The peninsula is connected to the mainland in the northwest.

The Joan Peninsula is the namesake of Joan Township, a geographic township that includes the Joan Peninsula.

See also
Cynthia Peninsula
McLean Peninsula

References

Peninsulas of Ontario
Landforms of Temagami